Tomlinson Fort (April 26, 1839 – December 4, 1910) was mayor of Chattanooga, Tennessee in 1876.

Fort was born in Milledgeville, Georgia, the son of U.S. Representative Tomlinson Fort.  He served as a colonel in the Confederate Army during the American Civil War.  He was elected mayor in 1875 and served during 1876.

He died in Chattanooga in 1910, and was buried in Memory Hill Cemetery in Milledgeville, Georgia.

External links

1839 births
1910 deaths
Confederate States Army officers
Mayors of Chattanooga, Tennessee
People from Milledgeville, Georgia
Burials at Memory Hill Cemetery
19th-century American politicians
People of Tennessee in the American Civil War